Veternica may refer to:

 Veternica (river), a river in Serbia
 Veternica (cave), a cave near Zagreb, Croatia
 Veternica, Krapina-Zagorje County, a village near Novi Golubovec, Croatia
 Veternica, one of the peaks of the Baba (North Macedonia) mountain